In topology and related branches of mathematics, the Kuratowski closure axioms are a set of axioms that can be used to define a topological structure on a set. They are equivalent to the more commonly used open set definition. They were first formalized by Kazimierz Kuratowski, and the idea was further studied by mathematicians such as Wacław Sierpiński and António Monteiro, among others.

A similar set of axioms can be used to define a topological structure using only the dual notion of interior operator.

Definition

Kuratowski closure operators and weakenings
Let  be an arbitrary set and  its power set. A Kuratowski closure operator is a unary operation  with the following properties:

A consequence of  preserving binary unions is the following condition:

In fact if we rewrite the equality in [K4] as an inclusion, giving the weaker axiom [K4''] (subadditivity):

then it is easy to see that axioms [K4'] and [K4''] together are equivalent to [K4] (see the next-to-last paragraph of Proof 2 below).

 includes a fifth (optional) axiom requiring that singleton sets should be stable under closure: for all , . He refers to topological spaces which satisfy all five axioms as T1-spaces in contrast to the more general spaces which only satisfy the four listed axioms. Indeed, these spaces correspond exactly to the topological T1-spaces via the usual correspondence (see below).

If requirement [K3] is omitted, then the axioms define a Čech closure operator. If [K1] is omitted instead, then an operator satisfying [K2], [K3] and [K4'] is said to be a Moore closure operator.

Alternative axiomatizations 
The four Kuratowski closure axioms can be replaced by a single condition, given by Pervin:

Axioms [K1]–[K4] can be derived as a consequence of this requirement:

 Choose . This immediately implies [K1].
Then, applying axiom [K1], implying [K2].
 Choose  and an arbitrary . Then, applying axiom [K1], which is [K3].
 Choose arbitrary . Applying axioms [K1]–[K3], one derives [K4].

Alternatively,  had proposed a weaker axiom that only entails [K2]–[K4]:

Requirement [K1] is independent of [M] : indeed, if , the operator  defined by the constant assignment  satisfies [M] but does not preserve the empty set, since . Notice that, by definition, any operator satisfying [M] is a Moore closure operator.

A more symmetric alternative to [M] was also proven by M. O. Botelho and M. H. Teixeira to imply axioms [K2]–[K4]:

Analogous structures

Interior, exterior and boundary operators 
A dual notion to Kuratowski closure operators is that of Kuratowski interior operator, which is a map  satisfying the following similar requirements:

For these operators, one can reach conclusions that are completely analogous to what was inferred for Kuratowski closures. For example, all Kuratowski interior operators are isotonic, i.e. they satisfy [K4'], and because of intensivity [I2], it is possible to weaken the equality in [I3] to a simple inclusion.

Every result obtained concerning  may be converted into a result concerning  by employing these relations in conjunction with the properties of the orthocomplementation .

Abstract operators 

Notice that axioms [K1]–[K4] may be adapted to define an abstract unary operation  on a general bounded lattice , by formally substituting set-theoretic inclusion with the partial order associated to the lattice, set-theoretic union with the join operation, and set-theoretic intersections with the meet operation; similarly for axioms [I1]–[I4]. If the lattice is orthocomplemented, these two abstract operations induce one another in the usual way. Abstract closure or interior operators can be used to define a generalized topology on the lattice.

Since neither unions nor the empty set appear in the requirement for a Moore closure operator, the definition may be adapted to define an abstract unary operator  on an arbitrary poset .

Connection to other axiomatizations of topology

Induction of topology from closure 
A closure operator naturally induces a topology as follows. Let  be an arbitrary set. We shall say that a subset  is closed with respect to a Kuratowski closure operator  if and only if it is a fixed point of said operator, or in other words it is stable under , i.e. . The claim is that the family of all subsets of the total space that are complements of closed sets satisfies the three usual requirements for a topology, or equivalently, the family  of all closed sets satisfies the following:

Notice that, by idempotency [K3], one may succinctly write .

[T1] By extensivity [K2],  and since closure maps the power set of  into itself (that is, the image of any subset is a subset of ),  we have . Thus .  The preservation of the empty set [K1] readily implies .

[T2] Next, let  be an arbitrary set of indices and let  be closed for every .  By extensivity [K2], .  Also, by isotonicity [K4'], if for all indices , then  for all , which implies .  Therefore, meaning .

[T3] Finally, let  be a finite set of indices and let  be closed for every .  From the preservation of binary unions [K4], and using induction on the number of subsets of which we take the union, we have . Thus, .

Induction of closure from topology 

[K1] Since ,  reduces to the intersection of all sets in the family ; but  by axiom [T1], so the intersection collapses to the null set and [K1] follows.

Hence follows extensivity [K2].

[K3] Notice that, for all , the family  contains  itself as a minimal element w.r.t. inclusion. Hence , which is idempotence [K3].

[K4'] Let : then , and thus . Since the latter family may contain more elements than the former, we find , which is isotonicity [K4'].

[K4] Finally, fix . Axiom [T2] implies ; furthermore, axiom [T2] implies that . But , so that all in all . Since then  is a minimal element of  w.r.t. inclusion, we find . Point 4. ensures additivity [K4].

Exact correspondence between the two structures 

For a given Kuratowski closure , define ; then if  its primed closure  is the intersection of all -stable sets that contain . Its non-primed closure  satisfies this description: by extensivity [K2] we have , and by idempotence [K3] we have , and thus . Now, let  such that : by isotonicity [K4'] we have , and since  we conclude that . Hence  is the minimal element of  w.r.t. inclusion, implying .

Now we prove that . Let : hence . But that is trivially  itself, implying .

However, this means that  is no longer a bijection.

Examples 

The set  is the smallest closed set of  containing , and the operator  is a Kuratowski closure operator.
 If  is any set, the operators  such that are Kuratowski closures. The first induces the indiscrete topology , while the second induces the discrete topology .

Fix an arbitrary , and let  be such that  for all . When , we once again retrieve the discrete topology  (i.e. , as can be seen from the definitions).
 If  is an infinite cardinal number such that , then the operator  such thatsatisfies all four Kuratowski axioms.

Properties 

 If , then .

Topological concepts in terms of closure

Refinements and subspaces 
A pair of Kuratowski closures  such that  for all  induce topologies  such that , and vice versa. In other words,  dominates  if and only if the topology induced by the latter is a refinement of the topology induced by the former, or equivalently . For example,   clearly dominates (the latter just being the identity on ).

In any induced topology (relative to the subset A) the closed sets induce a new closure operator that is just the original closure operator restricted to A: , for all .

Continuous maps, closed maps and homeomorphisms 
A function  is continuous at a point  iff , and it is continuous everywhere iff  for all subsets . The mapping  is a closed map iff the reverse inclusion holds, and it is a homeomorphism iff it is both continuous and closed, i.e. iff equality holds.

Separation axioms 
Let  be a Kuratowski closure space. Then

  is a T0-space iff  implies ;
  is a T1-space iff  for all ;

Closeness and separation 
A point  is close to a subset  if This can be used to define a proximity relation on the points and subsets of a set.

Two sets  are separated iff . The space  is connected iff it cannot be written as the union of two separated subsets.

See also

Notes

References
.
.

 .
.
.

External links
  Alternative Characterizations of Topological Spaces

Closure operators
Mathematical axioms